Terror attacks in Istanbul may refer to: